Dhani Waterfall also known as Dhani Noseri Waterfall is located in Neelum Valley, Muzaffarabad District of Azad Kashmir in Pakistan. It is the highest waterfall in Neelum Valley.

See also
Neelum Valley
List of waterfalls in Pakistan

References 

Waterfalls of Pakistan
Tourist attractions in Azad Kashmir
Landforms of Azad Kashmir
Muzaffarabad District